The Fine Arts and Flower Building, Altamont Fairground, also known as Exhibition Hall, was built in 1896 as part of the Altamont Fairgrounds in Village of Altamont, New York, near Albany.

The building is the only part of the fairground that remains largely in its original configuration.  It is a large one story cruciform building with a large open interior, representative of the architecture typical of agricultural fairgrounds  in the late 19th century.

It was listed on the National Register of Historic Places in 2004, having been in continuous use at the fairgrounds since 1896.

References

Buildings and structures on the National Register of Historic Places in New York (state)
Cultural infrastructure completed in 1896
Buildings and structures in Albany County, New York
National Register of Historic Places in Albany County, New York
Altamont, New York